Eutrechopsis ovalis is a species of beetle in the family Carabidae, the only species in the genus Eutrechopsis.

References

Trechinae